The Großer Moosstock is a mountain in South Tyrol, Italy. Hans Kammerlander reached the summit at age 8 by following two tourists.

References

Sources 
 Alpenverein South Tyrol 

Mountains of the Alps
Mountains of South Tyrol
Alpine three-thousanders
Venediger Group
Rieserferner-Ahrn Nature Park